David Mark Ward (born 10 February 1961 at Croydon, Surrey) is a former aggressive batsman and occasional wicket-keeper for Surrey County Cricket Club, playing from 1985 until 2004. In all first-class matches, he scored 8139 runs at an average of 38.39, with 16 centuries and a highest score of 294 not out. He scored "a remarkable 2,072 first-class runs in 1990, including seven hundreds".

Nicknamed "Gnasher" for his prominent teeth, Ward was something of a cult personality as a player. He is now a coach at Whitgift School, where his pupils have included England opening batsmen Rory Burns, Jason Roy and Dom Sibley, and several other players for Surrey, such as Freddie van den Bergh, Laurie Evans and Jamie Smith.

Within the conservative and restrictive world of cricket whites, Ward was able to demonstrate a little eccentricity, occasionally choosing to wear a cap or even helmet decorated in the traditional Harlequin pattern more associated with Douglas Jardine and other players of yester-year.

Ward currently plays club cricket for Old Whitgiftians C.C. in the Surrey Championship when his school duties allow.

References

External links
 Cricinfo profile
 

1961 births
Living people
English cricketers
Surrey cricketers
Hertfordshire cricketers
Marylebone Cricket Club cricketers
Minor Counties cricketers